Kelarabad District is a district (bakhsh) in Abbasabad County, Mazandaran Province, Iran. At the 2006 census, its population was 13,902, in 3,909 families.  The District has one city: Kelarabad. The District has one rural district (dehestan): Kelarabad Rural District.

References 

Abbasabad County
Districts of Mazandaran Province